The U.S. Post Office and Courthouse in Bismarck, North Dakota, United States, was built during 1912–13 and expanded in 1937.  It was designed by James Knox Taylor and includes Late 19th and 20th Century Revivals architecture and Second Renaissance Revival architecture.  Also known as Federal Building, it served historically as a courthouse and as a post office.  The building was listed on the National Register of Historic Places in 1976.

It is notable as one of the last works of James Knox Taylor, who was Supervising Architect of the U.S. Treasury from 1897 until 1912.

It is a three-story, steel-framed building with reinforced concrete floors and a red tile roof that can be seen from far away to the south.

References

Courthouses on the National Register of Historic Places in North Dakota
Former federal courthouses in the United States
Government buildings completed in 1913
Post office buildings on the National Register of Historic Places in North Dakota
Renaissance Revival architecture in North Dakota
1913 establishments in North Dakota
National Register of Historic Places in Bismarck, North Dakota